The 2016 Winnipeg Blue Bombers season was the 59th season for the team in the Canadian Football League and their 84th season overall. The Blue Bombers finished in 3rd place in the West Division and finished with an 11–7 record; their first winning season since 2011.

The Blue Bombers successfully improved upon their 5–13 record from 2015, after defeating the Saskatchewan Roughriders in the Labour Day Classic on September 4. It was their first win in the Classic since 2004.

The Blue Bombers qualified for the playoffs for the first time since 2011 with a week 16 victory over the BC Lions followed by losses by the Toronto Argonauts and Montreal Alouettes two days afterward. In the Playoffs the Blue Bombers ended up losing 32–31, ending their season.

Offseason

CFL draft
The 2016 CFL Draft took place on May 10, 2016. The Blue Bombers had eight selections in the eight-round draft. The team forfeited the second overall selection after selecting Garrett Waggoner in the 2015 Supplemental Draft. However, the Blue Bombers were able to get back into the top nine when they acquired the ninth overall selection after trading Chris Greaves to the Edmonton Eskimos.

Preseason

Regular season

Standings

Schedule

Post-season

Schedule

Team

Roster

Coaching staff

References

2016 Canadian Football League season by team
Winnipeg Blue Bombers seasons
Winnipeg Blue Bombers